Martin Lawrence Friedland,  (born September 21, 1932) is a Canadian lawyer, academic and author.

He received a BComm. (1955), LL.B. (1958), and honorary LL.D. from the University of Toronto, and a PhD (1968) and LL.D from Cambridge University. He was called to the Ontario Bar in 1960. He taught at Osgoode Hall Law School until 1965 when he joined the University of Toronto as an associate professor. He was promoted to professor in 1968 and served as dean from 1972–1979.

He was appointed a Fellow of the Royal Society of Canada in 1983. In 1990 he was made an Officer of the Order of Canada and was promoted to Companion in 2003. He was awarded the Molson Prize in 1994. In 2003 he was awarded the Sir John William Dawson Medal, for important contributions of knowledge in multiple domains, by the Royal Society of Canada. He received an honorary LL.D from York University in 2003.

Selected works
 A Place Apart: Judicial Independence and Accountability in Canada
 Access to the Law
 Detention before Trial
 Double Jeopardy
 The Case of Valentine Shortis
 The Death of Old Man Rice
 The Trials of Israel Lipski
 The University of Toronto: A History (University of Toronto Press, 2002, second edition, 2013 )
 My Life in Crime and Other Academic Adventures
 Searching for W.P.M. Kennedy: The Biography of an Enigma (2020)

References

Sources

External links
Martin Lawrence Friedland and Judith F. Friedland archival papers held at the University of Toronto Archives and Records Management Services

1932 births
Living people
Alumni of the University of Cambridge
Jewish Canadian writers
Canadian legal scholars
Canadian university and college faculty deans
Canadian non-fiction writers
Companions of the Order of Canada
Fellows of the Royal Society of Canada
Lawyers in Ontario
University of Toronto alumni
Academic staff of the University of Toronto
Writers from Toronto